Paola Hernández (born 1982) is a NYC based fashion designer, born in Mexico City. She started her career designing womenswear, menswear, knitwear, jewelry, and shoes in 2010. Since 2019 she is focused on knitwear only, made in the US. She believes “fashion is the manifestation of collective consciousness in everyday life.” Hernández tends to choose natural, biodegradable materials, and her pieces are usually made out of one single component—  which is easier to recycle, such as merino wool, cotton or silk.  

Hernández's main sources of inspiration are yoga, meditation, books, dance, and visual art. Prior to her career in fashion, she studied philosophy at Universidad Iberoamericana in Mexico City, followed by fashion at Central Saint Martin's College of Art and Design in London. Each season, she creates a collection based on a specific concept which guides the choices of colors, materials, and artwork. Her designs are based on philosophical concepts with a clean aesthetic. 

Throughout her career, she has presented her collections in New York, London, Paris, Reykjavik, Bogota, and Mexico City. She has also dressed a wide range of artists. Musicians from bands such as Yeah Yeah Yeahs, The Horrors, The Stills, Stars, Mexican Institute of Sound, Moderatto, Adanowsky, and Ximena Sarinana.

Hernández designs have been featured in a wide range of publications, from Vogue, Elle, Harper's Bazaar, InStyle, Nylon to WWD, The New York Times, and New York Magazine.

References

External links
 

Living people
1982 births
American fashion designers
American women fashion designers
People from Mexico City
People from Brooklyn
Alumni of Central Saint Martins
Date of birth missing (living people)
Mexican fashion designers
Mexican women fashion designers
American expatriates in England
Mexican expatriates in England